The Széki Palace in Cluj-Napoca is a Gothic Revival building on the shore of Someşul Mic River. It was built in 1893 for the university teacher and pharmacist Miklós Széki by the Hungarian architect Samu Pecz.  It is classified as a historic monument by the Romanian Ministry of Culture.

Buildings and structures in Cluj-Napoca
Historic monuments in Cluj County